Carlos Conceição Lopes, GOIH is a former Portuguese paralympian athlete who competed mainly in category T11 sprint events.

Lopes competed in the 1996 Summer Paralympics in Atlanta, United States. There he won a bronze medal in the men's 400 metres - T10 event, finished fourth in the men's 200 metres - T10 event and went out in the first round of the men's 800 metres - T10 event. He also competed at the 2000 Summer Paralympics in Sydney, Australia; he won a gold medal in the men's 4 x 400 metre relay - T13 event, a gold medal in the men's 400 metres - T11 event and finished fourth in the men's 200 metres - T11 event. He also competed at the 2004 Summer Paralympics in Athens, Greece; he finished seventh in the men's 100 metres - T11 event, did not finish in the men's 200 metres - T11 event and went out in the first round of the men's 4 x 400 metre relay - T11-13 event. He competed in the 2008 Summer Paralympics in Beijing, China. There he went out in the quarter-finals of the men's 100 metres - T11 event and was a part of the Portuguese relay team that went out in the first round of the men's 4 x 400 metre relay - T11-T13 event

Orders
 Grand Officer of the Order of Prince Henry

References

External links
 

Paralympic athletes of Portugal
Athletes (track and field) at the 1996 Summer Paralympics
Athletes (track and field) at the 2000 Summer Paralympics
Athletes (track and field) at the 2004 Summer Paralympics
Athletes (track and field) at the 2008 Summer Paralympics
Paralympic gold medalists for Portugal
Paralympic bronze medalists for Portugal
Year of birth missing (living people)
Living people
Medalists at the 1996 Summer Paralympics
Medalists at the 2000 Summer Paralympics
Paralympic medalists in athletics (track and field)
Portuguese male sprinters
Visually impaired sprinters
Paralympic sprinters
Blind people
Portuguese people with disabilities